Annemarie Waser (born 4 February 1940) is a Swiss alpine skier. She competed at the 1956 Winter Olympics and the 1960 Winter Olympics.

References

1940 births
Living people
Swiss female alpine skiers
Olympic alpine skiers of Switzerland
Alpine skiers at the 1956 Winter Olympics
Alpine skiers at the 1960 Winter Olympics
Place of birth missing (living people)
20th-century Swiss women